The 1990 New South Wales Rugby League season was the eighty-third season of professional rugby league football in Australia. Sixteen clubs competed for the J J Giltinan Shield and Winfield Cup during the premiership season, which culminated in a grand final between the previous season's premiers, the Canberra Raiders and the Penrith Panthers, who were making their grand final debut.

Season summary
For the 1990 season, the salary cap was introduced in the New South Wales Rugby League premiership. Twenty-two regular season rounds were played from March till August, resulting in a top six of Canberra, Brisbane, Penrith, Manly, Balmain and Newcastle.

Parramatta's halfback Peter Sterling won the official player of the year award, the Rothmans Medal. The Dally M Medal was awarded to Manly's five-eighth Cliff Lyons. Rugby League Week gave their player of the year award to Canberra Raiders centre and captain, Mal Meninga.

The grand finals;

  Canberra Raiders vs  Penrith Panthers (Senior Grade)
  Canberra Raiders vs  Brisbane Broncos (Reserve Grade)
  Canberra Raiders vs  St George Dragons (Under-21s Grade)

The winners in all grades were:

  Canberra Raiders (Senior Grade)
  Brisbane Broncos (Reserve Grade)
  Canberra Raiders (Under-21s Grade)

Teams
The number of teams competing remained unchanged for the second consecutive year, with sixteen clubs contesting the premiership, including five Sydney-based foundation teams, another six from Sydney, two from greater New South Wales, two from Queensland, and one from the Australian Capital Territory

Advertising
1990 saw the NSWRL's advertising shift to a new level of sophistication, marking the first use of Tina Turner's 1989 hit "The Best". The league and its Sydney advertising agency Hertz Walpole struck gold in forging a link between the game and the song, which would become the soundtrack to a marketing success story that skyrocketed right up to a point of self-implosion in the Super League war of 1996–1997.

Tina Turner's manager Roger Davies contacted agency chief Jim Walpole in 1989 to advise that Turner's upcoming album Foreign Affair was to contain a rendition of a Mike Chapman and Holly Knight song which might possibly be of interest to Walpole's NSWRL client. The track, which had been previously released by Bonnie Tyler with modest results, would prove to be one of Turner's most successful singles. After hearing demo tracks, Walpole and the NSWRL General Manager John Quayle and his marketing staff sensed the linkage could be perfect.

Turner was brought to Australia amid much public interest for a massive film shoot where enough footage was secured for advertisements for both the 1990 and 1991 seasons.

The finished 1990 advertisement, in its full two-minute version, tells the story of Turner's touchdown at Sydney Airport and a scurry through paparazzi; she then finds herself in a warehouse training scene that's more glamour than grit where players from a number of clubs are working out on weights and climbing vertical chains. She plays touch footy on a beach, attends a lunch where she cheekily surprises Gavin Miller, whom she had met at the 1989 UK shoot, and later arrives by helicopter to a black-tie dinner with Andrew Ettingshausen and Gene Miles. Throughout are the de rigueur big hits and action shots, with Turner cheering in a replica grand final crowd, and finally congratulating the 1989 premiership captain, Mal Meninga.

Ladder
South Sydney went from minor premiers in 1989 to wooden spooners in 1990, becoming the third club to suffer this ignominy after Canterbury from 1942 to 1943 and Western Suburbs from 1952 to 1953 – however, the Rabbitohs’ decline of sixteen and a half wins is easily the most severe in league history. It would mark the beginning of a 22-year barren wilderness for the Rabbitohs spanning 1990-2011 (which included two seasons excluded from the competition in 2000–01), during which they would only record a solitary finals appearance in 2007. Canberra won their first and to date only minor premiership.

Finals
Balmain and Newcastle both finished on equal competition points in fifth position at the end of the regular season, so had to play off for the chance to advance through the finals.

Chart

Grand final
The 1990 season's grand final was played on the afternoon of Sunday, 23 September at the Sydney Football Stadium before a crowd of 41,535. Penrith were attempting to become the first team to win a grand final in their first attempt, but were coming up against an experienced  Canberra team.

Extra time in the reserve grade grand final followed by the pre-match entertainment (including a performance by John Farnham) running late meant that referee Bill Harrigan blew time on for the kick-off half an hour behind schedule. This may have worked to the advantage of the more experienced Raiders and served to rattle the young Panthers. Canberra jumped to a 12-nil lead in the opening minutes after their half-back Ricky Stuart laid on tries for winger John Ferguson and Laurie Daley and the match appeared as good as over despite a strengthening of Penrith's defence as they recovered. The Panthers came back to trail 12-10 after Greg Alexander put Brad Fittler in for a try just before half-time and Paul Smith in for another seven minutes into the second half. Canberra moved to 18–10 in the second half when replacement winger Matthew Wood scored. A late try from Alexander still left Penrith trailing 18–14 at the full-time siren. Both sides finished with three tries each but the wizardry of Stuart and the kicking boot of Meninga were the difference that saw the Raiders with their second consecutive premiership.

Canberra's Ricky Stuart was awarded the Clive Churchill Medal as man of the match.

Canberra Raiders 18Tries: Ferguson, Daley, WoodGoals: Meninga 3/3

Penrith Panthers 14Tries: Fittler, Smith, AlexanderGoals: Alexander 1/3

Player statistics
The following statistics are as of the conclusion of Round 22.

Top 5 point scorers

Top 5 try scorers

Top 5 goal scorers

References

External links
1990 Winfield Cup 2min TVC
NSWRL season 1990 at rugbyleagueproject.com
1990 J J Giltinan Shield and Winfield Cup at rleague.com
NSWRL season 1990 at rugbyleagueproject.com
Results: 1981-90 at rabbitohs.com.au
 Rugby League Tables - Season 1990 The World of Rugby League

New South Wales Rugby League premiership
NSWRL season